Romeo Awakanu Mulbah (born 16 May 1987), known professionally as 2C, is a U.S-based Liberian singer and songwriter. He signed a record deal with OuttaSpace Entertainment in 2017 and teamed up with Akon to record "Mr. Mechanic". 2C has won several awards, including Artist of the Year at the 2010 Liberian Entertainment Awards.

Early life 
Romeo Awakanu Mulbah was born on 16 May 1987, in Bong Town, Liberia. When he was 5 years old, his family was displaced as a result of the First Liberian Civil War. They settled briefly in Ivory Coast before relocating to the United States.

Music career 
2C's interest in music and performing began at an early age. He won several dance competitions while residing in Ivory Coast, and also performed at various music showcases while living in Atlanta. In 2007, 2C teamed up with music producer Jason "Pit" Pittman to record his debut single "Liberia Girl". In 2009, he travelled to Ohio to perform in a showcase that had BET executive Pat Charles in attendance. 2C won the showcase and participated in BET's Wild Out Wednesday competition. Although he did not win the competition, his performance on stage gave him exposure and allowed him to perform throughout the United States and Canada. In 2014, 2C worked with Ghanaian duo Ruff n Smooth to record "I Wanna Be". He signed a record deal with Outtaspace Entertainment in 2017 and enlisted Akon to record "Mr. Mechanic". 2C went on a promo tour, performing in Liberia, Ghana and Senegal; he performed at the anniversary of King FM Radio station in the latter country.

Awards and nominations

References

External links 
 

1987 births
Living people
Liberian singers
Liberian songwriters
People from Bong County